Matthew Richard "Matt" Silverstein (born April 1, 1979) is an American television writer and co-creator with Dave Jeser of Drawn Together. He has also written for other television shows including 3rd Rock from the Sun, The Man Show, Action, Greg the Bunny, Axe Cop, The Goode Family and The Cleveland Show, and also created the MTV animated comedy DJ & the Fro in 2009. He cowrote the script to the film Accidental Love.

Biography
Silverstein was raised in a Jewish family in Oradell, New Jersey. Silverstein graduated from the Dwight-Englewood School in Englewood, New Jersey which he attended with Jeser. In 2015, Silverstein, along with Dave Jeser, developed author Joshua Miller's Golan the Insatiable for television appearing on Fox Television in May 2015. Producers were Jeser, Silverstein, Hend Baghdady and Nick Weidenfeld.

Filmography

Film

References

External links
 

1979 births
Living people
American television writers
Dwight-Englewood School alumni
American male television writers
Jewish American writers
People from Oradell, New Jersey
Screenwriters from New Jersey
21st-century American Jews